Colton Square Business Park is a business park in central Leicester, England.  The park is a combination of the former Charles Street police station, a listed building, and new modern office buildings.

Learndirect, Freeth Cartwright and Brewin Dolphin are among the park's occupiers.

References

External links 
 

Business parks of England
Leicester